The 1988 South Australian National Football League season was the 109th season of the top-level Australian rules football competition in South Australia.

Ladder

Grand final

References 

SAFL
South Australian National Football League seasons